The Bird and the Bee is the debut studio album by American indie pop duo The Bird and the Bee, released on January 23, 2007 by Blue Note Records. Containing three tracks which appeared on the band's 2006 EP Again and Again and Again and Again, the album received positive reviews from music critics. The first single, "Fucking Boyfriend", was a number-one hit on Billboards Hot Dance Club Play chart in December 2006.

Track listing

Personnel
Credits for The Bird and the Bee adapted from liner notes.

The Bird and the Bee
 Greg Kurstin – engineer, instrumentation, mixing, producer
 Inara George – vocals (all tracks); fuzz bass (1)

Additional personnel
 Autumn de Wilde – photography
 Josh Gold – project manager
 Gordon H. Jee – creative director
 Keith Karwelies – A&R
 Gavin Lurssen – mastering
 David Ralicke – horn (4)
 Helen Verhoeven – artwork
 Eli Wolf – A&R
 Burton Yount – package design

Charts

In Popular Culture
The song "Again & Again" is prominently sampled on the track "Lucky Ass Bitch" featuring Juicy J from Mac Miller's 2012 mixtape Macadelic.

References

2007 debut albums
Albums produced by Greg Kurstin
The Bird and the Bee albums
Blue Note Records albums